Orange blister beetle is a common name for several insects and may refer to:

Mylabris pustulata, native to South Asia
Zonitis vittigera, native to North America

Insect common names